Suleiman Khassim has served as an aviation secretary for the Ministry of Transportation in Nigeria.

References

Year of birth missing (living people)
Place of birth missing (living people)
Living people
Nigerian government officials